Derviş is the Turkish and Bosnian (Derviš) spelling of the Persian and Arabic word "", referring to a Sufi aspirant. The word appears as a given name and surname in various forms throughout Arabic, Bosnian (a Slavic language), Persian, and Turkish-speaking communities. An etymology for the name is given in the Oxford Dictionary of American Family Names:

Given name

Derviş
 Derviş Ali (died 1673), Ottoman calligrapher
 Derviş Ali Kavazoğlu (1924-1965), Turkish Cypriot politician assassinated by Turkish paramilitary group TMT.
 Derviş Eroğlu (born 1938), Turkish Cypriot former president of Northern Cyprus.
 Derviş Kemal Deniz (born 1954), Turkish Cypriot politician
 Dervis Konuralp (born 1980), British Paralympic swimmer of Turkish-Cypriot descent
 Derviş Turhan (1919–2010), Turkish jurist and former president of the Supreme Court
 Derviş Vahdeti (1870–1909), Cyprus-born Ottoman religious figure and journalist
 Derviş Zaim (born 1964), Turkish Cypriot novelist

Derviš
 Derviš-beg Alić Sarvanović, Ottoman governor of the sanjak of Montenegro
 Derviš Hadžiosmanović (born 1959), Montenegrin football coach and former player
 Derviš Sušić (1925–1990), Bosnian writer

Dervish
 Dervish Mehmed, the title and name of several historical Ottoman people

Surname
 Ahmet Derviş (1881–1932), officer of the Ottoman Army and the general of the Turkish Army
 Kemal Derviş (born 1949), Turkish economist and politician
 Suat Derviş (1904 oder 1905–1972), Turkish female novelist, journalist, and political activist

See also
 Dervish (disambiguation)
 Darwish
 Darvish (Sufi aspirant)
Darvish (disambiguation)

Turkish-language surnames
Turkish masculine given names
Dervish